Roderick Lovell (born 23 May 1972) is a Guyanese cricketer. He played in two first-class and three List A matches for Guyana from 1995 to 1998.

See also
 List of Guyanese representative cricketers

References

External links
 

1972 births
Living people
Guyanese cricketers
Guyana cricketers
Sportspeople from Georgetown, Guyana